Andorra debuted in the Eurovision Song Contest 2004 with the song "Jugarem a estimar-nos" written by Jofre Bardagí. The song was performed by Marta Roure. The Andorran broadcaster Ràdio i Televisió d'Andorra (RTVA) organised the national final 12 Punts in order to select the Andorran entry for the 2004 contest in Istanbul, Turkey. The national final took place over four stages and nine televised shows, resulting in the selection of Marta Roure as the winning artist and "Jugarem a estimar-nos" as the winning song during the final on 15 March 2004.

Andorra competed in the semi-final of the Eurovision Song Contest which took place on 12 May 2004. Performing during the show in position 6, "Jugarem a estimar-nos" was not announced among the top 10 entries of the semi-final and therefore did not qualify to compete in the final. It was later revealed that Andorra placed eighteenth out of the 22 participating countries in the semi-final with 12 points.

Background 

RTVA would also broadcast the event within Andorra and organise the selection process for the nation's entry. On 7 September 2003, RTVA announced that they would organise a national final to select the 2004 Andorran entry, while a collaboration with Catalan broadcaster Televisió de Catalunya (TVC) for the national final was announced on 24 November 2003.

Before Eurovision

12 Punts 
12 Punts (12 Points) was the national final that selected Andorra's entry for the Eurovision Song Contest 2004. The competition was a collaboration between Andorran broadcaster Ràdio i Televisió d'Andorra (RTVA) and Catalan broadcaster Televisió de Catalunya (TVC), and consisted of nine shows that commenced on 18 January 2004 and concluded with the final on 15 March 2004. All shows took place at the Auditori Nacional d'Andorra in Ordino, hosted by Pati Molné and Xavier Graset and broadcast in Andorra on ATV as well as in Catalonia on TV3 and via radio on Catalunya Cultura.

Format 
The selection of the Andorran Eurovision entry took place over four stages. The first stage, entitled Eurocàsting, took place between 26 October and 20 December 2003 and involved 40 candidates being presented to the public, with two artists being ultimately selected to proceed to the second stage of the competition. Eurocàsting was initially set to take place between November 2003 and January 2004 in the format of a talent show similar to the Spanish Operación Triunfo, however the idea was later dropped. The second stage was the six televised heats which took place between 18 January and 22 February 2004 with two songs competing in each show. One song was selected to proceed from each heat to the third stage, the semi-finals, which took place on 1 and 8 March 2004 with three songs, one of them being performed as a duet between the two finalists, competing in each show. One song was selected to proceed from each semi-final to the final. The fourth stage was the final, which took place on 15 March 2004 and featured the two songs that qualified from the semi-finals being performed by the two finalists. The winning artist and song was selected separately during the final, with the artist selection taking place throughout the nine shows of 12 Punts. The results of the heats, semi-finals and the final were determined by a combination of votes from a five-member professional jury and a public vote via SMS in Andorra and Catalonia. Each juror had an equal stake in the final result, while the public vote in each state/region had a weighting equal to the votes of a single juror.

The members of the jury panel were:

 Marc Llunas – singer
 Salvador Cufí – representative of record company Música Global
 Catheryne Metayer – Director of Cor de Petits Cantors d'Andorra
 Josep Maria Escribano – Director of the Conservatory of Andorra
 Oriol Vilella – musician

Eurocàsting 
Auditions for Eurocàsting took place on 26 October 2003 at the Fira d'Andorra in Andorra la Vella. Applicants were required to be aged at least 16, have Andorran citizenship or residency as of 2002 and fluency in Catalan. 40 applicants that attended the auditions were presented in November 2003 and a public vote that registered 16,000 votes selected the top six candidates to qualify for the next stage, which were announced on 4 December 2003. An additional three artists: Bis a Bis, Jordi Botey and Marta Roure were invited by RTVA to directly compete in the next stage as established acts that have released an album in the previous five years. On 10 December 2003, RTVA announced the two artists selected by a professional jury for 12 Punts.

Competing songs 
Twelve songs were provided by Música Global for 12 Punts and announced on 1 January 2004. An album containing the competing songs was later released on CD with one of the songs, "No és nou" performed by the band Gossos and Spanish Eurovision 2003 contestant Beth, becoming a hit in 2006.

Shows

Heats 
The six heats of 12 Punts took place between 18 January and 22 February 2004. In each heat two songs competed and one was selected by the combination of votes from a five-member professional jury (5/7), a public vote in Andorra (1/7) and a public vote in Catalonia (1/7) to qualify to the semi-finals. In addition to performing their assigned song, both Marta Roure and Bis a Bis performed an excerpt of the other song that competed in their respective heats.

Semi-finals 
The two semi-finals of 12 Punts took place on 1 and 8 March 2004. In each semi-final three of the songs that qualified from the preceding six heats competed, including a duet performance between Marta Roure and Bis a Bis for one of the songs, and one was selected by the combination of votes from a five-member professional jury (5/7), a public vote in Andorra (1/7) and a public vote in Catalonia (1/7) to qualify to the final. In addition to the performances of the competing songs, the first semi-final featured an interval act from the band Els Pets, while the second semi-final featured interval acts from the band Gossos and singer Lluís Llach.

Final
The final of 12 Punts took place on 15 March 2004. Both Marta Roure and Bis a Bis performed the two songs that qualified from the preceding two semi-finals and the winning song, "Jugarem a estimar-nos", was selected by the combination of votes from a five-member professional jury (5/7), a public vote in Andorra (1/7) and a public vote in Catalonia (1/7). Marta Roure was subsequently selected as the winning artist by the jury and public vote that ran throughout the nine shows between 18 January and 15 March 2004. In addition to the performances of the competing songs, the show featured an interval act from Spanish Eurovision 2003 contestant Beth.

At Eurovision 

It was announced that the competition's format would be expanded to include a semi-final in 2004. According to the rules, all nations with the exceptions of the host country, the "Big Four" (France, Germany, Spain and the United Kingdom) and the ten highest placed finishers in the 2003 contest are required to qualify from the semi-final on 12 May 2004 in order to compete for the final on 15 May 2004; the top ten countries from the semi-final progress to the final. On 23 March 2004, a special allocation draw was held which determined the running order for the semi-final and Andorra was set to perform in position 6, following the entry from Israel and before the entry from Portugal. At the end of the semi-final, Andorra was not announced among the top 10 entries in the semi-final and therefore failed to qualify to compete in the final. It was later revealed that Andorra placed eighteenth in the semi-final, receiving a total of 12 points, all of them which were awarded by Spain.

The semi-final and the final were broadcast in Andorra on ATV with commentary by Meri Picart and Josep Lluís Trabal. The Andorran spokesperson, who announced the Andorran votes during the final, was Pati Molné.

Voting 
Below is a breakdown of points awarded to Andorra and awarded by Andorra in the semi-final and grand final of the contest. The nation awarded its 12 points to Portugal in the semi-final and to Spain in the final of the contest.

Points awarded to Andorra

Points awarded by Andorra

References

External links
 12 Punts – Official site (TV3)
 Andorran National Final page (Archived 2009-10-25)

2004
Countries in the Eurovision Song Contest 2004
Eurovision